Niall Joseph Israel Thompson (born 3 September 1993) is an English professional footballer who is currently at Tiverton Town FC after leaving Truro City in July 2022 and previously played at Torquay United until  January 2015. He plays as a winger, but his versatility has seen him more recently act as a wing-back.

Torquay United
After coming through the Torquay youth system, he was offered a professional contract at the beginning of the 2012–13 season. He made his senior debut on 14 August 2012 in Torquay's 4–0 League Cup defeat Leicester City, coming on as a substitute for Craig Easton in the 63rd minute. Niall made his League debut on 25 August 2012 at home to Rochdale, his performance was very impressive for an 18-year-old and he was awarded 'Man of the match' for his efforts on his debut.

On 21 November 2014, Thompson signed on a month's loan with Southern League club Truro City, having previously been loaned to Bideford earlier in the 2014–15 season. He made his debut as a substitute in Truro's 2–1 win at Dunstable Town on 22 November. On his return to Torquay, he was released at the end of his contract at the beginning of January 2015.

On 11 July 2016, Thompson signed a permanent deal with Truro City, now of the National League South.
He has also played for Hucknall Town, Sheffield and Mickleover Sports.

Career statistics

References

External links
 http://www.torquayunited.com/news/article/united-0-leicester-4-312469.aspx?pageView=full#anchored

1993 births
Living people
English footballers
Association football midfielders
Torquay United F.C. players
Truro City F.C. players
English Football League players
Black British sportsmen
Hucknall Town F.C. players
Footballers from Derby